Sar Duran (also Romanized as Sar Dūrān; also known as Sar Darūn and Savdarūn) is a village in Fazl Rural District, Zarrin Dasht District, Nahavand County, Hamadan Province, Iran. At the 2006 census, its population was 349, in 88 families.

References 

Populated places in Nahavand County